FC Kristall Smolensk was a Russian football team from Smolensk. It played professionally from 1993 to 2003. They played on the second-highest level in the Russian First Division from 1997 to 2003, where their best result was 4th place in 1998. In 2004 a new club was founded in Smolensk, called FC Smolensk.

Team name history
 1992: FC SKD Smolensk
 1993–1994: FC Kristall Smolensk
 1995–1998: FC CSK VVS-Kristall Smolensk
 1998–2004: FC Kristall Smolensk

External links
  Team history at KLISF
 FC Kristall Smolensk

Association football clubs established in 1992
Association football clubs disestablished in 2004
Defunct football clubs in Russia
Sport in Smolensk
1992 establishments in Russia
2004 disestablishments in Russia